Waldshut station is a railway station in the city of Waldshut-Tiengen in the German state of Baden-Württemberg.

History
The station was opened on 30 October 1856.

Description
The station lies on the High Rhine Railway, which connects Basel and Singen along the northern and, mostly, German bank of the Rhine. It is the junction point for the Turgi–Koblenz–Waldshut line, which crosses the Rhine from Switzerland on the Waldshut to Koblenz railway bridge just to the south of the station.

The Upper Rhine Railway has yet to be electrified and most services are operated by diesel locomotives or railcars, although electrification has been agreed upon and is planned. The line from Switzerland is electrified using the Swiss standard of 15 kV and 16.7 Hz from an overhead line. Only one terminal platform's track in the station is electrified, and this is used by all trains from Switzerland.

Customs
Passengers using Platform 5 which serves trains running to and from Switzerland are subject to customs formalities from both countries as the train line lies on a customs border. Checks may occur in Waldshut station by German customs officers as well as on the train by Swiss customs officials. Checks by the Swiss may also take place in the first Swiss station, namely Koblenz. Systematic passport controls were abolished when Switzerland joined the Schengen Area in 2008.

Train services
The station is a border station and as such is in local transport tariff zones in both Germany and Switzerland.

 the following services stop at Waldshut:

RB:

References

External links

Railway stations in Baden-Württemberg
Railway stations in Germany opened in 1856
Buildings and structures in Waldshut (district)